The men's team large hill ski jumping event at the FIS Nordic World Ski Championships 2011 was held 5 March 2011 at 15:30 CET. Austria's team of Wolfgang Loitzl, Martin Koch, Thomas Morgenstern, and Gregor Schlierenzauer are the defending world champions and are the Olympic champions with Loitzl, Andreas Kofler, Morgenstern, and Schlierenzauer.

Results

References

FIS Nordic World Ski Championships 2011